College of Veterinary and Animal Sciences (CVAS) is a sub-campus of University of Veterinary and Animal Sciences, Lahore located at Jhang, Punjab, Pakistan. The college was established in 2006 as an initiative for veterinary education under special consideration of Lt. Gen. (Rtd.) Khalid Maqbool (then Governor of the Punjab and Chancellor, University of Veterinary and Animal Sciences Lahore). The founder Principal of the college was Prof. Dr. Ashiq Hussain Cheema, who was a renowned Veterinary Pathologist. The current principal is Prof. Dr. Muhammad Fiaz Qamar.

The college comprises five major departments offering a five-year DVM degree program. The academic, research and supporting services blocks, dairy and poultry farms, processing units for milk, meat and feed, Clinical Centrum for all species, libraries, auditorium, sports facilities and residences are all under development.

The Degree programs are accredited by the Pakistan Veterinary Medical Council (PVMC). Students from this campus participate in world veterinary day.

Departments
 Department of Pathobiology (Pathology, Microbiology and Parasitology)
 Department of Basic Sciences (Anatomy & Histology, Physiology & Biochemistry and Pharmacology & Toxicology)
 Department of Animal Sciences (Livestock Production, Poultry Production, Animal Nutrition, Animal Breeding & Genetics)
 Department of Clinical Sciences (Veterinary Medicine, Veterinary Surgery, Theriogenology and Epidemiology & Public Health)
 Department of Social Sciences (Computer Science, Math & Statistics, Islamic Studies, Pakistan Studies, Economics, English and Continuing Education & Extension)

The college offers 5-year Doctor of Veterinary Medicine (DVM) and 4-year BS Honors programs in Applied Microbiology and Poultry Sciences. Postgraduate programs are  offered in 10 disciplines.

See also
 Pakistan Veterinary Medical Council
 University of Veterinary and Animal Sciences, Lahore
 Cholistan University of Veterinary and Animal Sciences, Bahawalpur

References

External links
 CVAS official website

Veterinary schools in Pakistan
Universities and colleges in Jhang District
University of Veterinary and Animal Sciences